Ditrău (or Gyergyóditró ) is a commune in Harghita County, Transylvania, Romania. It is composed of three villages: Ditrău, Jolotca (Orotva), and Țengheler (Csengellér or Cengellér).

The highest point of Ditrău is the Piricske height. Ditrău was first registered in 1567, as Gitró, with 26 gates. There is a significant syenite reserve near the village.

History

The villages belonged first to the Székely seat of Gyergyószék, which was subsequently absorbed into Csíkszék, until the administrative reform of Transylvania in 1876, when they fell within the Csík County in the Kingdom of Hungary.

After the Hungarian–Romanian War of 1919 and Treaty of Trianon of 1920, the villages became part of the Kingdom of Romania and fell within Ciuc County during the interwar period. In 1940, the Second Vienna Award granted Northern Transylvania to Hungary and the villages were held by Hungary until the fall of 1944.

After Soviet occupation, the Romanian administration returned in March 1945. Between 1952 and 1960, the commune fell within the Magyar Autonomous Region, between 1960 and 1968 the Mureș-Magyar Autonomous Region. In 1968, the region was abolished, and since then, the commune has been part of Harghita County. From January to March 2020, a xenophobic incident occurred between the local population and two Sri Lankan immigrants who worked at the bakery Ditrói Pékség.

Demographics
The commune has a Székely (Hungarian) majority. According to the 2002 census it has a population of 5,480 of which 98.87% or 5,418 are Hungarian.

Economy
The village was formerly known for its mining activity – the ditroit, a marble-like sodalite stone used in construction.

Tourist attractions
 Szent Katalin Church, built in 1653.
 Near Szent Katalin Church there is a 75m high church built between 1908 and 1913, which is known locally as the "big" church. This is the second highest church in this region. Its construction cost 800,000 Austro-Hungarian koronas.

Notable natives and residents
 István Kovács (1911–2011), Hungarian Communist politician
 Tivadar Puskás (1844–1893), Hungarian inventor of the telephone exchange

Twinnings 

  Bátaszék, Hungary
  Budajenő, Hungary
  Kamut, Hungary

References

Communes in Harghita County
Localities in Transylvania
Székely communities